Simone Storm (born 1 March 1969) is a Brazilian volleyball player. She competed in the women's tournament at the 1988 Summer Olympics.

References

External links
 

1969 births
Living people
Brazilian women's volleyball players
Olympic volleyball players of Brazil
Volleyball players at the 1988 Summer Olympics
People from Brusque, Santa Catarina
Sportspeople from Santa Catarina (state)